George Bingham may refer to:

Sir George Bingham, 2nd Baronet (c. 1625–1682), Irish MP for Castlebar, Custos Rotulorum for Mayo
George Bingham, 3rd Earl of Lucan (1800–1888), British field marshal, MP and Lord Lieutenant for Mayo
George Caleb Bingham (1811–1879), American artist
George Bingham, 4th Earl of Lucan (1830–1914), British MP for Mayo and Lord Lieutenant of Mayo 
George Bingham, 5th Earl of Lucan (1860–1949), British MP for Chertsey, Government Chief Whip
George Hutchins Bingham (1864–1949), judge of the United States Court of Appeals
George Bingham, 6th Earl of Lucan (1898–1964), British Under-Secretary of State for Commonwealth Relations
George Bingham, 8th Earl of Lucan (born 1967), British investment banker
George G. Bingham (1855–1924), American judge and legal educator in the state of Oregon
George W. Bingham (1860–1947), American politician in the state of Wisconsin
George Bingham (antiquary) (1715–1800), divine and antiquary
Sir George Bingham (military governor), military governor of Sligo, 1569; one of two people, either (1) the brother or (2) a cousin of Richard Bingham (1528–1599)
Sir George Ridout Bingham (1777–1833), British Army officer in the Napoleonic Wars